The Milan Kosanovic Cup is an international rugby league football competition played between the Russia Bears, Ukraine and Serbia. The inaugural match will be played in Ukraine.

The cup is named after Milan Kosanović, the first Serb to play Rugby League at Wembley Stadium.

Results

See also

References

External links

Rugby league international tournaments
European rugby league competitions